The Champs was a comedy podcast hosted by Neal Brennan, Moshe Kasher, and DJ Douggpound (Doug Lussenhop of the Tim and Eric Show). Guests on the podcast were almost exclusively black. It was part of the All Things Comedy podcast network.

Episodes

2011

2012

2013

2014

2015-16

References

External links

Lists of radio series episodes